Peter Ernest Naktenis (June 12, 1914 – August 1, 2007) was a pitcher in Major League Baseball who played for the Philadelphia Athletics (1936) and Cincinnati Reds (1939). He was born in Aberdeen, Washington.

In a two-season career, Naktenis posted a 0–1 record with 19 strikeouts and a 10.72 ERA in 10 games pitched.

An alumnus of Duke University, Naktenis died in Singer Island, Florida, at the age of 93. At the time of his death, he was recognized as one of the oldest living MLB players.

References

External links

The Hartford Courant

1914 births
2007 deaths
Cincinnati Reds players
Philadelphia Athletics players
Major League Baseball pitchers
Baseball players from Washington (state)
Binghamton Triplets players
Albany Senators players
Columbia Reds players
Baltimore Orioles (IL) players
Birmingham Barons players
Milwaukee Brewers (minor league) players
Hartford Bees players
Duke Blue Devils baseball players
Hartford Laurels players